The 1935 Philippine general election was the first general election of the Commonwealth of the Philippines. This was also the first direct election of the President of the Philippines and Vice President of the Philippines, positions created by the 1935 constitution. Furthermore, members of the National Assembly of the Philippines, that replaced the Philippine Legislature were elected.

The Nacionalista Party, which was split into two camps supporting Manuel L. Quezon and Sergio Osmeña, and reconciled prior to the election, maintained its electoral superiority, with Quezon winning the presidency, Osmeña the vice presidency, and majority of the National Assembly seats.

Results

President

Vice president

National Assembly

1935 elections in the Philippines
General elections in the Philippines